Washington State Normal School may refer to several historic institutions in the state of Washington, U.S., or in Washington County, Maine, U.S.

Washington State Normal School at Bellingham, now Western Washington University
Washington State Normal School at Ellensburg, now Central Washington University 
Washington State Normal School at Cheney Historic District, now Eastern Washington University 
Washington State Normal School, located in Machias, Maine, now University of Maine at Machias